Kingston station may refer to:

Australia
 Kingston railway station, Brisbane
 Kingston railway station, Victoria

Canada
Kingston station (Ontario)
Kingston Bus Terminal, Ontario, Canada

Jamaica
 Kingston railway station, Jamaica

New Zealand
 Kingston railway station, New Zealand, on the Kingston Branch

United Kingdom
 Kingston railway station (England)

United States
 Kingston/Route 3 station, in Massachusetts
 Kingston, New York railroad stations
 Kingston Railroad Station (Pennsylvania), on the Ligonier Valley Railroad
 Kingston station (Rhode Island)

See also
List of places called Kingston